Lille Ekkerøy is an island in Vadsø Municipality in Finnmark county, Norway.

World War II
The lighthouse on the island was a cause of concern to Soviet forces in World War II and, at one stage, the keeper was captured and taken away for questioning by a landing party of Soviet marines.

Polar bear
In 1953, a polar bear was shot on the island. The bear was found by the brothers Aksel Jacobsen Bogdanoff (1922–1971) and Ingvald Bogdanoff (1920–1995) when they were out inspecting their salmon nets in the area. It was believed that the bear had come on an ice-floe from Svalbard.

This is the last time that a polar bear was seen anywhere in Finnmark county.

Population
Although the island is now uninhabited, this was not always the case.  In 1567, when there were only eight families in the town of Vadsø and five families in Store Ekkerøy, there were eight families on Lille Ekkerøy.

The eleven children of Signe Bogdanoff (née Dahl, from Tromsø) and Jacob Wilhelm Bogdanoff (which included the brothers Aksel Jacobsen Bogdanoff and Ingvald Bogdanoff mentioned above) were the last generation who lived on Lille Ekkerøy. They were evacuated during World War II, moving to Krampenes, but returned and lived there until about 1953, when they moved back to Krampenes.

See also
Store Ekkerøy

References

Vadsø
Islands of the Barents Sea